, sometimes archaically romanized Hongwan-ji, is a Jodo Shinshu Buddhist temple located in the Tsukiji district of Tokyo, Japan.

The temple is adjacent to Tsukiji Station on the Tokyo Metro Hibiya Line.

History 

Tsukiji Hongan-ji's predecessor was the temple of Edo-Asakusa Gobo (江戸浅草御坊), built in Asakusa in 1617 at the behest of the 12th monshu, Junnyo Shōnin.

The temple burned during a citywide fire in 1657, and the shogunate refused to allow it to be rebuilt in Asakusa due to a prior project there. Instead, the temple was moved to a new parcel of land being reclaimed along the Sumida River—today's Tsukiji. This land was said to have been reclaimed by Jodo Shinshu followers themselves who lived at nearby Tsukudajima.  The name Tsukiji comes from the kanji characters meaning "reclaimed land". This new temple, named Tsukiji Gobo (築地御坊), stood until it was leveled by the Great Kantō earthquake of 1923.

The present Tsukiji Hongan-ji was designed by Itō Chūta of the University of Tokyo and built between 1931 and 1934. It is noted for its unique architecture, influenced by temples in India.

Hongan-ji is a pilgrimage destination due to its artifacts of Prince Shotoku, Shinran Shonin, and Shonyō Shōnin.  Shonyō Shōnin (1911-2002), the 23rd monshu is enshrined to the left of the main altar in honor of his contributions to the spreading the Jodo Shinshu teachings abroad so that followers would not be in "name only".

The wake of Hiroaki Shukuzawa was held there on June 22, 2006, and a memorial to popular rock musician Hideto Matsumoto, better known as hide, can be found in the main hall itself, as the temple was the site of the musician's funerary ceremony in 1998.

See also 
 Hongan-ji Nagoya Betsuin, which has architectural resemblance
 Glossary of Japanese Buddhism for an explanation of terms concerning Japanese Buddhism, its art, and temple architecture.
 Statue of Shinran, Tokyo

References

External links 
Official website

Buddhist temples in Tokyo
Buildings and structures in Chūō, Tokyo
Shinshū Honganji-ha temples
Tsukiji